The 2005 Bristol City Council election took place on 5 May 2005, on the same day as other local elections. The Liberal Democrats made a number of gains and became the largest party on the Council, but failed to gain enough seats to form an overall majority.

Ward results

Ashley

Avonmouth

Bishopston

Cabot

Clifton

Clifton East

Cotham

Easton

Eastville

Frome Vale

Henbury

Henleaze

Hillfields

Horfield

Kingsweston

Lawrence Hill

Lockleaze

Redland

Southmead

St George East

St George West

Stoke Bishop

Westbury-on-Trym

References

2005 English local elections
2005
2000s in Bristol